Tatyana Viktorovna Lysenko (born 9 October 1983 in Bataysk) is a Russian hammer thrower. Her career has been blighted by repeated doping infractions. In February 2019, the Court of Arbitration for Sport handed her an eight-year ban for doping, starting from 2 July 2016.

Career
Lysenko's first world record was 77.06 metres, achieved on 15 July 2005 in Moscow, beating the old record of Mihaela Melinte by 0.99 metres. On 12 June 2006 she lost the record to Gulfiya Khanafeyeva, who threw 77.26 metres at the Russian athletics championships in Tula. However, Lysenko threw 77.41 metres on June 24 in Zhukovsky and 77.80 metres in Tallinn, Estonia on August 15. On 21 July 2007 it was reported that she failed a drug test, testing positive for a women's hormone blocker. In 2008, she was found guilty of using 6α-methylandrostendione and received a two-year ban (15.07.07 – 14.07.09) and disqualification of all results from 9 May 2007, including her world record of 78.61 m set on 26 May 2007.

Lysenko returned to competition in July 2009, taking the Russian title with 76.41 m. She won the gold at the 2010 IAAF Continental Cup and ranked third in the inaugural IAAF Hammer Throw Challenge at the end of the year, with a combined score of 223.96 metres for her three best throws. In 2011, she won her first world championship in the first world championships where the top three women all went over 75 m. She was awarded the hammer throw gold medal at the 2012 London Olympics with a throw of 78.18 m. She won the 2013 World Championships with a world leading throw of 78.80 m.

In May 2016 La Gazzetta dello Sport reported that a retest of Lysenko's samples from the 2012 Summer Olympics had tested positive for doping products, her third failure. If confirmed in the B sample, she stood to lose her Olympic and second World titles and faced a lifetime ban from the sport. In October, she was stripped of her Olympic gold medal.

International competitions

See also
List of doping cases in athletics
List of World Athletics Championships medalists (women)
List of European Athletics Championships medalists (women)
Doping at the Olympic Games
List of 2012 Summer Olympics medal winners
List of stripped Olympic medals
List of Russian sportspeople
List of hammer throwers

References

External links

1983 births
Living people
Sportspeople from Rostov Oblast
Russian female hammer throwers
Olympic female hammer throwers
Olympic athletes of Russia
Athletes (track and field) at the 2004 Summer Olympics
Athletes (track and field) at the 2012 Summer Olympics
Competitors stripped of Summer Olympics medals
World Athletics Championships athletes for Russia
World Athletics Championships medalists
World Athletics Championships winners
IAAF Continental Cup winners
European Athletics Championships winners
European Athletics Championships medalists
Russian Athletics Championships winners
World record setters in athletics (track and field)
Doping cases in athletics
Russian sportspeople in doping cases